Texas A&M University-Commerce Field House or University Field House is a 5,000 seat multi-purpose arena on the campus of Texas A&M University–Commerce in Commerce, Texas.  It was built in 1950 when the school was known as East Texas State Teachers College.  It is the home of the Texas A&M–Commerce Lions men's and women's basketball teams, as well as home to Lions volleyball. The Field House is also used as the location for the university's commencement exercises.

History

In the fall of 1949, East Texas State president James Gee first announced the construction of the Field House and Memorial Stadium. At a cost of $325,000, the crews of George L. Dahl were able to complete the project in just over a year. Since the original structure was built, there was a renovation in 1969 that included a two-story addition for classrooms and offices, a dressing room and a storage area. A third renovation came in 1991 to include the installation of new bleachers, scoreboards, heating and ventilation and a refurbishment of the one-acre maple hardwood floor. In 2009, the Field House received its most modern renovations with a brand new playing floor, digital scoreboards, new ventilation and heating, more efficient lighting, renovations to offices and classrooms, new basketball goals with digital shot-clocks.

Building features and structure

The Field House covers 69,000 square feet and will seat 5,000 people for either a volleyball or basketball contest. The facility is also the host to the University's Athletic Administration staff, the Sports Medicine Department and the Health and Human Performance Department; in addition to the offices for the basketball, cross country and track and field, golf, soccer, softball and volleyball teams. 

The Field House is shaped like an airplane hangar and has space for three basketball courts crossways. The floor allows three games to be played at the same time under one roof. The one lengthwise court is reserved for A&M-Commerce basketball and volleyball matches. With an arched roof, 58 feet from the ground at the highest point, is supported on steel beams that are stationed at one end.

Usage

In addition to being used for A&M-Commerce Basketball and Volleyball, the A&M-Commerce intrascholastic Intramural Sports Basketball Championships for both Men and Women are played at the Field House. Also, the University Interscholastic League hosts the High School conference AAAA Region II Basketball tournaments for both Men and Women. The winners of the respective tournaments go on to play in the state basketball tournament.

References

College basketball venues in the United States
College volleyball venues in the United States
Texas A&M–Commerce Lions basketball
Texas A&M–Commerce Lions volleyball
Basketball venues in Texas
Indoor arenas in Texas
Volleyball venues in the Dallas–Fort Worth metroplex